Dalmose is a village on Zealand, Denmark. It is located in Slagelse Municipality.

References

Cities and towns in Region Zealand
Slagelse Municipality
Villages in Denmark